Lachlan Watson (born April 12, 2001) is an American actor, best known for playing trans boy Theo Putnam in the Netflix original series Chilling Adventures of Sabrina, and non-binary twins Glen and Glenda Tilly in the second season of the Syfy/USA Network original series Chucky.

Personal life 
Watson was born on April 12, 2001, and was raised in Raleigh, North Carolina. Watson received their high school diploma through a homeschooling program in 2018.

Watson is non-binary and pansexual and goes by they/them pronouns. They are a feminist.

In November 2018, Watson was featured on a Netflix-produced talk segment titled What I Wish You Knew: About Being Nonbinary, where they discussed gender identity with other non-binary celebrities Jacob Tobia, Liv Hewson, and Shiva Raichandani.

Career 
Watson began acting as a child at the Burning Coal Theatre, where their mother worked. They became active in the Triangle theatre scene and landed small roles on the television shows Nashville and Drop Dead Diva. In 2015, they performed in the Raleigh Little Theatre's production of William Shakespeare's Much Ado About Nothing.

In 2018, Watson landed a regular role in the Netflix original series Chilling Adventures of Sabrina after a nationwide casting call where they sent in a taped audition. Watson plays a transgender boy named Theo Putnam (previously "Susie"). Watson stated that they used their own personal experience to shape the character and to influence the way the character's story line is written in order to resonate with genderqueer viewers. At the time of their debut in Chilling Adventures of Sabrina, Watson was one of the youngest self-identified non-binary actors in Hollywood.

At Sony Interactive Entertainment's "Future of Gaming" online event for the PlayStation 5 in June 2020, it was revealed that Watson would voice the anthropomorphic protagonist, Fang, of their upcoming 2023 video game Goodbye Volcano High. In June 2022, it was revealed they would be portraying non-binary twins Glen and Glenda Tilly in the second season of Chucky, later reviving the characters in a series of sketches on their TikTok channel.

References

External links
 

Living people
2001 births
21st-century American actors
Actors from Raleigh, North Carolina
American feminists
American stage actors
American television actors
LGBT feminists
LGBT people from North Carolina
Pansexual actors
American non-binary actors
Pansexual non-binary people